Le Roy J. Simmons (also spelled LeRoy and Leroy) was a Democratic member of the Wisconsin State Assembly from 1945 to 1952. Simmons was the second African American to become a member of the Assembly, after Lucian H. Palmer, but the first to preside over it. He was born on July 25, 1905 in Milwaukee, Wisconsin. Simmons was a salesman. He died on May 8, 1973.

See also
List of African-American officeholders (1900–1959)

References

External links

Politicians from Milwaukee
Businesspeople from Wisconsin
African-American state legislators in Wisconsin
1905 births
1973 deaths
20th-century American politicians
20th-century American businesspeople
20th-century African-American politicians
African-American men in politics
Democratic Party members of the Wisconsin State Assembly